Mark Jamieson is an Australian politician and former business executive currently serving as the Mayor of the Sunshine Coast Region, the ninth most-populous local government area in Australia, and fifth most-populous in Queensland. He has also served as President of the Local Government Association of Queensland, director of the South-East Queensland Council of Mayors and as a director of the Australian Local Government Association since 2016.

Jamieson was first elected in April 2012 with 31.93% of the primary vote, placing first in a field of 8 candidates. He retained office in 2016 with 61.90% of the vote, and was elected for the third time at the local government elections held in 2020, winning 49.48%.

Prior to his election to the mayoralty, Jamieson served in various senior executive positions, including as CEO of Australia-New Zealand publishing company APN News & Media. Jamieson is a graduate of the Australian Institute of Company Directors.

References

Mayors of places in Queensland
Living people
Year of birth missing (living people)